Morehead-Rowan County Airport  was a public airport located six nautical miles (11 km) southwest of the central business district of Morehead, a city in Rowan County, Kentucky, United States. It was owned by the Morehead-Rowan County Airport Board.

In 2003, the airport board began construction on the Morehead-Rowan County Clyde A. Thomas Regional Airport . The new airport opened in 2007, which resulted in the closure of the old airport.

Facilities and aircraft
It contained one runway designated 5/23 with an asphalt surface measuring 2,600 x 75 ft (792 x 23 m). For the 12-month period ending August 28, 2002, the airport had 5,300 aircraft operations, an average of 14 per day: 92% general aviation, 4% air taxi and 4% military.

References

External links
 

Defunct airports in the United States
Airports in Kentucky
Buildings and structures in Rowan County, Kentucky